The Port Washington Parking District (also known as the Port Washington Public Parking District) is a special public parking district in Nassau County, on Long Island, in New York, United States. It serves the Greater Port Washington area of Long Island's North Shore and is operated by the Town of North Hempstead.

History 
The Port Washington Parking District was established by the Town of North Hempstead in 1948, with the purpose of establishing, maintaining, and regulating parking facilities and parking meters in Port Washington's downtown area, such as for local commuters using the Port Washington Long Island Rail Road station, shoppers, and merchants.

For the construction of several of the lots, most notably between the 1940s and 1960s, the Port Washington Parking District used eminent domain to acquire several of the lots needed for the parking facilities.

In 1959, the district opened its main commuter parking lot at the Port Washington LIRR station, with enough parking spaces for 411 cars.

In 1969, the boundaries of the district were expanded, taking in several incorporated villages surrounding the hamlet of Port Washington (Baxter Estates, Flower Hill, Manorhaven, Port Washington North, and Sands Point). As a result of the expansion, legislation was enacted limiting parking at the Port Washington LIRR station to residents of the parking district.

As of 2022, the Port Washington Parking District operates 12 lots, some of which require residential permits exclusively available to district residents or merchants between certain hours and on certain days (specifically the commuter and merchant lots).

Communities served 

 Baxter Estates
 Flower Hill
 Manorhaven
 Port Washington
 Port Washington North
 Plandome Manor
 Sands Point

See also 

 Port Washington Water Pollution Control District

References

External links 

 Official website

Special districts of New York (state)
Special districts in Nassau County, New York
Long Island
Nassau County, New York
Parking by city
Town of North Hempstead, New York